Mister X or Mr. X is commonly used as a pseudonym for someone whose name is secret or unknown.

Mister X may refer to:

Comics 
 Mister X (Marvel Comics), a supervillain in the Marvel Universe
 Mister X (Vortex), the protagonist in Dean Motter's comic book series of that title
 The Amazing Mr X (comics), Britain's first superhero, who first appeared in The Dandy comic in 1944

Video games 
 Mr. X (Streets of Rage), the villain in the video game series Streets of Rage
 The villain in the video game The Ship
 The final villain in the video game Kung-Fu Master
 The pseudonym of Dr. Wily in Mega Man 6
Xander Payne, a character from the Archie Mega Man
 The pseudonym of Olga Gurlukovich during the Big Shell Incident in Metal Gear Solid 2: Sons of Liberty
 T-103, a.k.a. Mr. X, a Tyrant Bio Organic Weapon (B.O.W. for short) in Resident Evil 2 and its remake

Film and television
 Mister X (1958 film), a 1958 Soviet musical film directed by Yuli Khmelnitsky
 Mister X (1967 film), a 1967 Italian superhero film directed by Piero Vivarelli also known as Avenger X
 Mr. X (1987 film), a 1987 Bollywood sci-fi film starring Amol Palekar directed by Khwaja Ahmad Abbas
 Mr. X (2015 film), a 2015 Bollywood sci-fi film starring Emraan Hashmi
 Mr. X, a recurring puppet on The Canadian Howdy Doody Show
 Mr. X, a recurring arch-criminal of comic Arabic films played by Fouad el-Mohandes
 Mr. X, in the animated series The X's
 Mr. X, a villain in the anime series Lupin III
 Mr. X (Simpsons), Homer's pseudonym in The Simpsons episode "The Computer Wore Menace Shoes"
 X (The X-Files), a character in the television series The X-Files
 The Amazing Mr. X, a.k.a. The Spiritualist, a 1948 thriller film
 Mr. X, the main character in the 1940s and 1950s radio and TV series The Man Called X
 Mr. X, an assassin in the 2008 film Wanted, played by David O'Hara
 Mr. X, a character who appears in the Fringe episode "Lysergic Acid Diethylamide"
 Mr. X, the pseudonym for Goofy in the animated short Aquamania
 Mr. X, a Teenage Mutant Ninja Turtles character associated with Mondo Gecko
 The placeholder name the farmer is given when he gets amnesia in the Shaun the Sheep Movie
 Mr. X, a secondary character in Big Time Rush
 Mr. X (Amphibia character), a character in Amphibia
 "Mr. X" (Amphibia episode), the character's eponymous debut episode

Music 
 Mister X (band), a street punk group from Belarus
 "Mr X", a song by Ultravox from their album Vienna
 "Mr X", a song and single by Pauline Murray And The Invisible Girls
 Mister X, a character in the operetta Die Zirkusprinzessin (The Circus Princess) by Emmerich Kálmán
 Mr.X, American DJ also known as Afrika Islam
 Mr. X, mystery music composer of the film Enai Noki Paayum Thota
 Mr. X, drummer formerly in the band The Meatmen
 Mr. X, a character from God in Three Persons

Pseudonymous uses 
 Donald Graves (Kremlinologist) (1929–2008), U.S. State Department analyst, from the 1982 Washington Post article "The Secret Files of Mr. X"
 George F. Kennan (1904–2005), American historian, in his essay "The Sources of Soviet Conduct"
 Carl Sagan (1934–1996), American astronomer, in an essay on his experiences with marijuana
 Norman Wexler (1926–1999), American screenwriter, in Bob Zmuda's Andy Kaufman Revealed
 Gaston Defferre (1910–1986), French Politician, using this pseudonym during the 1965 Presidential Elections
 Ben Zygier, a prisoner who was held in Israel
 The former longtime boyfriend of American radio talk show host, Robin Quivers

Other uses 
 Aeros Mister X, a Ukrainian paraglider
 "Mr. X", nickname of American golfer Miller Barber (1931–2013)
 Mr. X, a masked professional wrestler in the 1930s and 1940s, one of the identities of Cyclone Mackey
 Mr. X, a masked professional wrestler in the WWF in the 1970s, one of the identities of Jerry Balisok 
 Mr. X, a masked professional wrestler in the WWF in the 1980s, one of the identities of Dan Marsh 
 Mr X, a novel by Peter Straub
 Mr. X, a player character in the board game Scotland Yard and its spin-off, Mister X
 Mister X, an alias used by Mayuka Kondō in the manga and anime series, Oniichan no Koto Nanka Zenzen Suki Janain Dakara ne!!

See also
 Doctor X (disambiguation)
 Miss X (disambiguation)
 Professor X (disambiguation)
 Nomen nescio (often abbreviated as N.N.)
 John Doe
 X (disambiguation)

Anonymity pseudonyms